
Gmina Kamienica Polska is a rural gmina (administrative district) in Częstochowa County, Silesian Voivodeship, in southern Poland.

Villages
The Gmina is made up of 9 villages which 6 are incorporated and 3 are unincorporated. Gmina Kamienica Polska contains the villages and settlements of Kamienica Polska, Osiny, Podlesie, Romanów, Rudnik Wielki, Wanaty, Zawada and Zawisna.

Neighbouring gminas
Gmina Kamienica Polska is bordered by the gminas of Koziegłowy, Olsztyn, Poczesna, Poraj, Starcza and Woźniki.

References

Kamienica Polska
Częstochowa County